The Qualification and Selection of Open Source software (QSOS) is a methodology for assessing Free/Libre Open Source Software. This methodology is released under the GFDL license.

General approach

QSOS defines 4 steps that are part of an iterative process:

 1 - Define and organise what will be assessed (common Open Source criteria and risks and technical domain specific functionalities),
 2 - Assess the competing software against the criteria defined above and score these criteria individually,
 3 - Qualify your evaluation by organising criteria into evaluation axes, and defining filtering (weightings, etc.) related to your context,
 4 - Select the appropriate OSS by scoring all competing software using the filtering system designed in step 3.

Output documents
This process generates software assessing sheets as well as comparison grids. These comparison grids eventually assist the user to choose the right software depending on the context.
These documents are also released under the free GNU FDL License. This allows them to be reused and improved as well as to remain more objective.
Assessment sheets are stored using an XML-based format.

Tools
Several tools distributed under the GPL license are provided to help users manipulate QSOS documents:
 Template editor: QSOS XUL Template Editor
 Assessment sheets editors:
 QSOS XUL Editor
 QSOS Qt Editor
 QSOS Java Editor (under development)

See also

 Open source software assessment methodologies
 Open Source Software
 Free Software

External links
 Official QSOS website
 Community website for the QSOS project

Free software culture and documents
Maturity models